Rivka or Rivkah is a Hebrew given name.

Notable people with the name include:

Rivkah Michaeli (born 1938), Israeli actress, comedian, television hostess, and entertainer
Rivkah (artist), American comic book artist and writer
Rebecca (Rivka in modern Israeli Hebrew), biblical matriarch from the Book of Genesis

See also
Rebecca (given name), a feminine given name of Hebrew origin
Rebecca (disambiguation)